The Gârboveta is a left tributary of the river Bârlad in Romania. It discharges into the Bârlad in Armășeni.

References

Rivers of Romania
Rivers of Vaslui County
Rivers of Iași County